Bacon jam is a bacon-based relish, similar to the Austrian starter Verhackertes. It is made through a process of slow cooking the bacon, along with onions, vinegar, brown sugar and spices, before mixing in a food processor.

Bacon jam, like fruit jams, requires a certain level of sugars to be officially labelled 'jam'.

Recipe

Bacon jam is made by slow cooking a combination of bacon, onions, brown sugar and vinegar, then placing the mixture in a food processor and putting it into jars. Variations on this recipe include altering the cooking time between two and six hours, and adding other ingredients such as maple syrup, garlic, a variety of spices and bourbon.

Verhackert

Without the sweeteners the recipe bears some similarity to the Austrian dish, Verhackert. Verhackert is a spread of minced bacon, combined with garlic and salt. A traditional dish, the preparation of bacon takes place over two months, which includes freezing the meat two to three times. Once the meat is ready, it is minced with the other ingredients and pressed into a terrine. Verhackert is served cold with bread as an appetizer.

Notable producers
 Skillet Street Food, a gourmet burger van in Seattle.
 The Bacon Jams, a gourmet food producer in the Philadelphia area, which sells at festivals and nationwide online.
 Martin and Suzie Cowley, who run a fine food business in Rhondda, South Wales, introduced a variant of bacon jam containing Jack Daniel's in 2015.

See also
 List of spreads

References

External links
 Stewart, Martha. "Slow-Cooker Bacon Jam". MarthaStewart.com
 "Maple Bourbon Bacon Jam". Closet Cooking.

Bacon dishes